Qualification for the women's tournament at the 2006 Winter Olympics was determined by the IIHF World Ranking following the 2004 Women's World Ice Hockey Championships.  The top four teams in the World Ranking received automatic berths into the Olympics, Italy received an automatic berth as host, and all other teams had an opportunity to qualify for the remaining three spots in the Olympics.

Qualified Teams

Notes

IIHF World Ranking

North Korea and Denmark chose not to participate in Olympic qualifying.

Qualification Tournaments
Three round-robins were played from 11 to 14 November 2004. The teams ranked 5th, 6th and 7th reserved the right to host these tournaments. The three group winners qualified for the Olympic tournament.

Group A
Games were played in Podolsk, Russia.

Group B
Games were played in Bad Tölz, Germany.

Group C
Games were played in Beijing, China.

References

External links
Qualifier results at IIHF.com
Qualifier results at passionhockey.com
World Ice Hockey Championships 2001
Official 2002 Olympic results
World Ice Hockey Championships 2003
World Ice Hockey Championships 2004

Womens
Olympics